Videoex is a Zurich-based Film festival for Experimental film and Video art. Starting in 1988, it is dedicated to the genre of experimental film.  It occurs every year during the last two weeks of May.

The festival usually consists of a Swiss and an international competition, retrospectives of artists, a program dedicated to one or more filmmakers and a guest program. Besides its film program Videoex also hosts Expanded Cinema live acts, performances, discussions and workshops.

History 
Videoex took place for the first time in December 1998 as a one-week experimental film screening at the cinema Xenix in Zurich. A manifold program has evolved that attracts an international audience and the number of submitted film and video works has increased every year. In 2008 more than 1800 works from over 50 countries were submitted.

Awards and jury 
The awards and jury members over the years are listed below.

Program 
The programs for each year are listed below.

Partners and sponsors 
Videoex is organized by the non-profit association Videoex and supported by private and public funding agencies. The festival became a regional institution of the Canton of Zurich in 2012, and has been incorporated into the cultural mission statement of the City of Zurich.

References

External links 
 Official website

Experimental film festivals